The North African campaign of the Second World War took place in North Africa from 10 June 1940 to 13 May 1943. It included campaigns fought in the Libyan and Egyptian deserts (Western Desert Campaign, also known as the Desert War) and in Morocco and Algeria (Operation Torch), as well as Tunisia (Tunisia Campaign).

The campaign was fought between the Allies and the Axis Powers. The Allied war effort was dominated by the British Commonwealth and exiles from German-occupied Europe. The United States officially entered the war in December 1941 and began direct military assistance in North Africa on 11 May 1942.

Fighting in North Africa started with the Italian declaration of war on 10 June 1940. On 14 June, the British Army's 11th Hussars (assisted by elements of the 1st Royal Tank Regiment, 1st RTR) crossed the border from Egypt into Libya and captured the Italian Fort Capuzzo. This was followed by an Italian counter-offensive into Egypt and the capture of Sidi Barrani in September and its recapture by the British in December following a British Commonwealth counteroffensive, Operation Compass. During Operation Compass, the Italian 10th Army was destroyed and the German Afrika Korps—commanded by Erwin Rommel, who later became known as "The Desert Fox"—was dispatched to North Africa in February 1941 during Operation Sonnenblume to reinforce Italian forces in order to prevent a complete Axis defeat.

A fluctuating series of battles for control of Libya and regions of Egypt followed, reaching a climax in the Second Battle of El Alamein in October 1942 when British Commonwealth forces under the command of Lieutenant-General Bernard Montgomery inflicted a decisive defeat on Rommel's Afrika Korps and forced its remnants into Tunisia. After the Anglo-American landings (Operation Torch) in North-West Africa in November 1942, and subsequent battles against Vichy France forces (who then changed sides), the Allies encircled several hundred thousand German and Italian personnel in northern Tunisia and finally forced their surrender in May 1943.

Information gleaned via British Ultra code-breaking intelligence proved critical to Allied success in North Africa. Victory for the Allies in this campaign immediately led to the Italian Campaign, which culminated in the downfall of the fascist government in Italy and the elimination of Germany's main European ally.

The North Africa campaign saw numerous atrocities and abuses by both German and Italian forces towards prisoners of war and local Jewish, Berber, and Arab populations.

Western Desert campaign 

On 10 May 1940, the Wehrmacht started the Battle of France (or Westfeldzug). One month later, it was clear that France would have to surrender within two weeks. The Armistice at Compiègne took place on 22 June 1940.

On 10 June, the Kingdom of Italy aligned itself with Nazi Germany and declared war upon France and the United Kingdom. British forces (along with Indian and Rhodesian troops) based in Egypt were ordered to take defensive measures, but to avoid  provocation as much as possible. However, on 11 June they began a series of raids against Italian positions in Libya. Following the defeat of France on 25 June, Italian forces in Tripolitania—facing French troops based in Tunisia—redeployed to Cyrenaica to reinforce the Italian Tenth Army. This, coupled with the steadily degrading equipment of the British forces, led General Archibald Wavell to order an end to the raids and place the defence of the Egyptian border with a small screening force.

Italian dictator Benito Mussolini ordered the Tenth Army to invade Egypt by 8 August. Two days later, no invasion having been launched, Mussolini ordered Marshal Graziani that, the moment German forces launched Operation Sea Lion, he was to attack. On 8 September, the Italians—hampered by a lack of transport, enfeebled by the low level of training among officers, and weakened by the state of its supporting equipment—were ordered to invade Egypt the following day. The battle plan was to advance along the coastal road while limited armoured forces operated on the desert flank.

To counter the Italian advance, Wavel ordered his screening forces to harass the advancing Italians, falling back towards Mersa Matruh, where the main British infantry force was based. Positioned on the desert flank was the 7th Armoured Division, which would strike at the flank of the Italian force.

Despite Mussolini urging them to carry on, Graziani ordered his men to dig in around Sidi Barrani, and fortified camps were established in forward locations; additional troops were also positioned behind the main force. In response to the dispersed Italian camps, the British planned a limited five-day attack, Operation Compass, to strike at these fortified camps one by one. The British Commonwealth force, totalling 36,000 men, attacked the forward elements of the 10-division-strong Italian army on 9 December. Following their initial success, the forces of Operation Compass pursued the retreating Italian forces. In January, the small port at Bardia was taken, soon followed by the seizure of the fortified port of Tobruk.

Some 40,000 Italians were captured in and around the two ports, with the remainder of the Tenth Army retreating along the coast road back to El Agheila. Richard O'Connor sent the 7th Armoured Division across the desert with a small reconnaissance group. It reached Beda Fomm some ninety minutes before the Italians, cutting off their retreat. Although they tried desperately to overcome the British force at the Battle of Beda Fomm, the Italians were unable to break through, and the remnants of the retreating army surrendered. Over 10 weeks Allied forces had destroyed the Italian Tenth Army and reached El Agheila, taking 130,000 prisoners of war in the process.

Mussolini requested help from his German allies, while the Italian Comando Supremo speedily sent several large motorized and armoured forces to protect their colonies in North Africa. This greatly expanded reinforcement included the soon-to-be-renowned Ariete Armoured division under General Ettore Baldassarre. Meanwhile, the Germans hastily assembled a motorized force, whose lead elements arrived in Tripoli in February. This relatively small expeditionary force, termed the Afrika Korps by Adolf Hitler, was placed under the command of Erwin Rommel. His orders were to reinforce the Italians and block Allied attempts to drive them out of the region. However, the initial commitment of only one panzer division and subsequently, no more than two panzer and one motorized divisions, indicated the limited extent of German involvement and commitment to this theatre of operations. The bulk of the reinforcements were Italian and therefore it was up to the Italians to do the bulk of the fighting. The forward Allied force—now named XIII Corps—adopted a defensive posture and over the coming months was built up, before most of its veteran forces were redeployed to Greece. In addition, the 7th Armoured Division was withdrawn to the Nile delta. The veteran forces were replaced by inexperienced newcomers, ill-equipped to face German armour.

Although Rommel had been ordered to simply hold the line, an armoured reconnaissance soon became a full-fledged offensive from El Agheila in March. In March–April, Allied forces were forced back and leading general officers captured. With Tobruk under siege by the main Italian-German force, a small battlegroup continued to press eastwards. Capturing Fort Capuzzo and Bardia in passing, it then advanced into Egypt, and by the end of April it had taken Sollum and the tactically important Halfaya Pass. Rommel garrisoned these positions, reinforcing the battle-group and ordering it onto the defensive.

Though isolated on land, Tobruk's garrison continued to receive supplies and replacements, delivered by the Royal Navy at night. Rommel's forces did not have the strength or training to take the fortress. This created a supply problem for his forward units. His front-line positions at Sollum were at the end of an extended supply chain that stretched back to Tripoli and had to bypass the coast road at Tobruk. Further, he was constantly threatened with a breakout of the British forces at Tobruk. Without Tobruk in Axis hands, further advances into Egypt were impractical.

The Allies launched a small-scale counter-attack called Operation Brevity in an attempt to push Axis forces off the key passes at the border, with some initial success. However they could not hold the advance positions and followed Brevity up with a much larger-scale offensive, Operation Battleaxe intended to relieve the siege at Tobruk, but this operation also failed.

Following the failure of Operation Battleaxe, Archibald Wavell was relieved of command and replaced by Claude Auchinleck. The Western Desert Force was reinforced with a second corps, XXX Corps, with the two corps forming the Eighth Army. Eighth Army was made up of army forces from the Commonwealth nations, including the British Army, the Australian Army, the Indian Army, the New Zealand Army, the South African Army, and the Sudan Defence Force. There was also a brigade of Free French under Marie-Pierre Koenig.

The new formation launched a new offensive, Operation Crusader, in November. After a see-saw battle, the 70th Division garrisoning Tobruk was relieved and the Axis forces were forced to fall back. By January 1942, the front line was again at El Agheila.

After receiving supplies and reinforcements from Tripoli, the Axis attacked again, defeating the Allies at Gazala in June and capturing Tobruk. The Axis forces drove the Eighth Army back over the Egyptian border, but their advance was stopped in July only  from Alexandria in the First Battle of El Alamein.

Of great significance, on 29 June reports of British military operations in North Africa sent to Washington by the US Military Attaché in Cairo, Bonner Fellers, no longer used the compromised "Black Code" which the Axis forces had been reading, so the Axis could no longer learn of British "strengths, positions, losses, reinforcements, supply, situation, plans, morale etc" as they had since 1940.

General Auchinleck, although he had checked Rommel's advance at the First Battle of El Alamein, was replaced by General Harold Alexander. Lieutenant-General William Gott was promoted from XIII Corps commander to command of the entire Eighth Army, but he was killed when his aircraft was intercepted and shot down over Egypt. He was replaced by Lieutenant-General Bernard Montgomery.

At the end of June, Axis forces made a second attempt to break through the Allied defences at El Alamein at Alam Halfa, but were unsuccessful. After a lengthy period of build-up and training, the Eighth Army launched a major offensive, decisively defeating the Italian-German army in the Second Battle of El Alamein in late October, driving Axis forces west and capturing Tripoli in mid-January 1943. By February, the Eighth Army was facing the Italian-German Panzer Army near the Mareth Line and came under command of General Harold Alexander's 18th Army Group for the concluding phase of the war in North Africa - the Tunisia Campaign.

Operation Torch

Operation Torch in November 1942 was a compromise operation that met the British objective of securing victory in North Africa while allowing American armed forces the opportunity to engage in the fight against Nazi Germany on a limited scale. In addition, as Joseph Stalin, the leader of the Soviet Union, had long been pleading for a second front to be opened to engage the Wehrmacht and relieve pressure on the Red Army, it provided some degree of relief for the Red Army on the Eastern Front by diverting Axis forces to the North African theatre. Over half the German Ju 52 transport planes that were needed to supply the encircled Axis forces at Stalingrad were tied up supplying Axis forces in North Africa.

Senior U.S. commanders were strongly opposed to proposed landings in North-West Africa. After the western Allied Combined Chiefs of Staff (CCS) met in London on 30 July 1942 General George Marshall and Admiral Ernest King declined to approve the plan. Marshall and other U.S. generals advocated the invasion of northern Europe later that year, which the British rejected. After Prime Minister Winston Churchill pressed for a landing in French North Africa in 1942, Marshall suggested instead to President Franklin D. Roosevelt that the U.S. abandon the Germany first strategy and take the offensive in the Pacific. Roosevelt said it would do nothing to help Russia. With Marshall unable to persuade the British to change their minds, President Roosevelt gave a direct order that Operation Torch was to have precedence over other operations and was to take place at the earliest possible date, one of only two direct orders he gave to military commanders during the war.

The landings started on 8 November, and finished on 16 November. In an attempt to pincer German and Italian forces, Allied forces (American and British Commonwealth) landed in Vichy-held French North Africa under the assumption that there would be little to no resistance. Nevertheless, Vichy French forces put up a strong and bloody resistance to the Allies in Oran and Morocco, but not in Algiers, where a coup d'état by the French resistance on 8 November succeeded in neutralizing the French XIX Corps before the landing and arresting the Vichy commanders. Consequently, the landings met no practical opposition in Algiers, and the city was captured on the first day along with the entire Vichy African command. After three days of talks and threats, Generals Mark Clark and Dwight Eisenhower compelled Vichy Admiral François Darlan and General Alphonse Juin to order the cessation on 10–11 November of armed resistance from Vichy forces in Oran and Morocco, promising to make Darlan the head of a Free French administration. During Operation Torch, Americans fought Vichy French and German navy vessels in the Naval Battle of Casablanca, which ended in an American victory.

The Allied landings prompted the Axis occupation of Vichy France (Case Anton). In addition, the Italians captured the French fleet at Toulon, which did them little good, as the main portion of the fleet had been scuttled to prevent their use by the Axis.

The Vichy army in North Africa joined the Allies.

Tunisian campaign 

Following the Operation Torch landings—from early November 1942—the Germans and Italians initiated a buildup of troops in Tunisia to fill the vacuum left by Vichy troops which had withdrawn. During this period of weakness, the Allies decided against a rapid advance into Tunisia while they wrestled with the Vichy authorities. Many of the Allied soldiers were tied up in garrison duties because of the uncertain status and intentions of the Vichy forces.

By mid-November, the Allies were able to advance into Tunisia, but only in single division strength. By early December, the Eastern Task Force—which had been redesignated as the British First Army under Lieutenant-General Kenneth Anderson—was composed of the British 78th Infantry Division, British 6th Armoured Division, 1st Parachute Brigade, No. 6 Commando and elements of US 1st Armored Division. But by this time, one German and five Italian divisions had been shipped from Europe and the remoteness of Allied airfields from the front line gave the Axis clear air superiority over the battlefield. The Allies were halted and pushed back having advanced eastwards to within  of Tunis.

During the winter, there followed a period of stalemate during which time both sides continued to build up their forces. By the new year, the British First Army had one British, one US and one French Corps (a second British Corps headquarters was activated in April). In the second half of February, in eastern Tunisia, Rommel and von Arnim had some successes against the mainly inexperienced French and US troops, most notably in routing the US II Corps commanded by Major General Lloyd Fredendall at the Battle of Kasserine Pass.

By the beginning of March, the British Eighth Army—advancing westward along the North African coast—had reached the Tunisian border. Rommel and von Arnim found themselves in an Allied "two army" pincer. They were outflanked, outmanned and outgunned. Rommel went back to Germany for health reasons and was substituted by the Italian general Messe.

The British Eighth Army bypassed the Axis defence on the Mareth Line in late March after harsh fighting and First Army in central Tunisia launched their main offensive in mid-April to squeeze the Axis forces until their resistance in Africa collapsed. The Axis forces surrendered on 13 May 1943 yielding over 275,000 prisoners of war. The last Axis force to surrender in North Africa was the 1st Italian Army of general Messe. This huge loss of experienced troops greatly reduced the military capacity of the Axis powers, although some Axis troops escaped Tunisia. This defeat in Africa led to all Italian colonies in Africa being captured.

Intelligence

Axis 

The Axis had considerable success in intelligence gathering through radio communication intercepts and monitoring unit radio traffic. The most important success came through intercepting the reports of Colonel Bonner Fellers, the US military attaché in Egypt. He had been tasked by General George Marshall with providing detailed reports on the military situation in Africa. Fellers talked with British military and civilian headquarters personnel, read documents and visited the battlefront. Known to the Germans as "die gute Quelle" (the good source) or more jokingly as 'the little fellow', he transmitted his reports back to Washington using the "Black Code" of the US State Department. However, in September 1941, the Italians had stolen a code book containing the Black Code, photographed it and returned it to the US embassy in Rome. The Italians shared parts of their intercepts with their German allies. In addition the "Chiffrierabteilung" (German military cipher branch) were soon able to break the code. Fellers' reports were very detailed and played a significant role in informing the Germans of allied strength and intentions between January and June 1942.

In addition, the Italian Servizio Informazioni Segrete or SIS code-breakers were able to successfully intercept much radio encrypted signals intelligence (SIGINT) from British aircraft traffic as well as first-class ciphers from British vessels and land bases, providing Supermarina (Regia Marina) with timely warnings of Allied intentions in the Mediterranean. Indeed, so successful was the Italian SIS in handling the bulk of Axis naval intelligence in the Mediterranean, that "Britain's offensive use of SIGINT was largely negated by Italy's defensive SIGINT."

The Afrika Korps had the intelligence services of the 621st Signals Battalion mobile monitoring element which arrived in North Africa in late April 1941, commanded by Hauptmann Alfred Seeböhm. The 621st Signals Battalion monitored radio communications among British units. Unfortunately for the Allies, the British not only failed to change their codes with any frequency, they were also prone to poor radio discipline in combat. Their officers made frequent open, uncoded transmissions to their commands, allowing the Germans to more easily identify British units and deployments. The situation changed after a counterattack during the Battle of Gazala resulted in the 621st Signals Battalion being overrun and destroyed, and a number of their documents captured, alerting British intelligence to the problem. The British responded by instituting an improved call signal procedure, introducing radiotelephonic codes, imposing rigid wireless silence on reserve formations, padding out real messages with dummy traffic, tightening up on their radio discipline in combat and creating an entire fake signals network in the southern sector.

Allies 

Allied codebreakers read much enciphered German message traffic, especially that encrypted with the Enigma machine. The Allies' Ultra programme was initially of limited value, as it took too long to get the information to the commanders in the field, and at times provided information that was less than helpful. In terms of anticipating the next move the Germans would make, reliance on Ultra sometimes backfired. Part of the reason the initial German attacks in March 1941 were so successful was that Ultra intercepts had informed Wavell that OKW had clearly directed Rommel not to take any offensive action, but to wait until he was further reinforced with the 15th Panzer Division in May. Rommel received this information, but placed more value on his own assessment of the situation. Trusting that the Germans had no intention of taking major action, the British command did not respond until it was too late. Furthermore, Rommel did not generally provide OKW or the Italian Comando Supremo details of his planned operations, for he thought the Italians too prone to leak the information. Thus on 21 January 1942, when Rommel struck out on his second offensive from El Agheila, Comando Supremo was just as surprised to learn of it as the British were. Ultra intercepts provided the British with such information as the name of the new German commander, his time of arrival, and the numbers and condition of the Axis forces, but they might not correctly reveal Rommel's intentions.

The primary benefit of Ultra intercepts to the effort in North Africa was to aid in cutting the Axis supply line to Tunisia. Ultra intercepts provided valuable information about the times and routes of Axis supply shipments across the Mediterranean. This was critical in providing the British with the opportunity to intercept and destroy them. During the time when Malta was under heavy air attack, the ability to act on this information was limited, but as Allied air and naval strength improved, the information became instrumental to Allied success. It is estimated that 40% to 60% of Axis supply shipping was located and destroyed due to decrypted information. However, this claim is strongly disputed by the authors Vincent P. O'Hara and Enrico Cernuschi (2013) who claim that authors like F.H. Hinsley have greatly exaggerated the effects of ULTRA. For example, they claim that intelligence provided by ULTRA had little impact in stopping Italian convoys reaching North Africa. Of the 2.67 million tons of materiel, fuel, and munitions shipped to Africa—nearly all in Italian vessels and under Italian escort—2.24 million tons managed to arrive despite the best efforts of ULTRA and the British Navy to prevent it. In effect, "Ultra did not deny the Axis armies the supplies they needed to reach the Nile."

Heavy losses of German paratroopers in Crete, made possible by Ultra warnings of the drop times and locations, meant that Hitler hesitated in attacking Malta, which aided the British in gaining control of the Mediterranean, as did the losses of the Italian Navy at the Battle of Cape Matapan. To conceal the fact that German coded messages were being read, a fact critical to the overall Allied war effort, British command required a flyover mission be carried out before a convoy could be attacked in order to give the appearance that a reconnaissance flight had discovered the target.

Canada provided a small contingent of 201 commissioned officers and 147 non-commissioned officers.

Atrocities 
The North Africa campaign was often labeled a "war without hate," a pure military clash in the desert without the partisan roundups and ethnic cleansing happening in Europe. This view has been challenged by recent historians, given that there were indeed many civilians who lived in the region, and the campaign was marked by numerous atrocities and abuses by both German and Italian forces towards prisoners of war and local Jewish, Berber, and Arab populations. These acts were often motivated by racism and antisemitism.

Aftermath 

After victory by the Allies in the North African campaign, the stage was set for the Italian Campaign to begin. The invasion of Sicily followed two months later. Nearly 400,000 Axis and Allied troops were lost, injured or died of disease by the end of the North African campaign.

See also 

 List of British military equipment of World War II

 List of equipment of the United States Army during World War II
 List of French military equipment of World War II
 List of German military equipment of World War II
 List of Italian Army equipment in World War II
 List of World War II Battles
 List of North African Campaign battles
 North African campaign timeline
 Timeline of World War II in 1940194119421943

Notes

Footnotes

Citations

References

External links 

 The Jews of North Africa and the Holocaust  an e-Newsletter for Holocaust educators by Yad Vashem
 BBC's flash video of the North African campaign
 Timeline of the North African campaign
 Canadian World War 2 Online Newspaper Archives – The North African Campaigns, 1940–1943
 North African Campaign Desert War.net

 
1940s in Africa
1940s in Egypt
1940s in Libya
African theatres of World War II
Battles and operations of World War II involving Australia
Battles and operations of World War II involving France
Battles and operations of World War II involving Germany
Battles and operations of World War II involving India
Battles and operations of World War II involving Italy
Battles and operations of World War II involving New Zealand
Battles and operations of World War II involving Poland
Battles and operations of World War II involving South Africa
Battles and operations of World War II involving the United States
Campaigns of World War II
Campaigns, operations and battles of World War II involving the United Kingdom
Conflicts in 1940
Conflicts in 1941
Conflicts in 1942
Conflicts in 1943
Egypt in World War II
Libya in World War II
Military campaigns involving Germany
Tunisian campaign
United States Army Rangers
Western Desert campaign